Kilsyth is an unincorporated community in Fayette County, West Virginia, United States. Kilsyth had a post office, which opened on May 3, 1902, and closed on July 23, 2005.

The community's name is a transfer from Kilsyth, in Scotland.

References

Unincorporated communities in Fayette County, West Virginia
Unincorporated communities in West Virginia
Coal towns in West Virginia